The 2016 Columbus Challenger 1 was a professional tennis tournament played on indoor hard courts. It was the second edition of the tournament which was part of the 2016 ATP Challenger Tour. It took place in Columbus, United States between 19 and 25 September 2016.

Singles main draw entrants

Seeds

 1 Rankings are as of September 12, 2016.

Other entrants
The following players received entry into the singles main draw as wildcards:
  J. J. Wolf
  John McNally
  Martin Joyce
  Mikael Torpegaard

The following player received entry into the singles main draw as an alternate:
  Marcelo Arévalo

The following players received entry from the qualifying draw:
  Jared Hiltzik
  Roberto Quiroz
  Miķelis Lībietis
  Gonzales Austin

Champions

Singles

 Mikael Torpegaard def.   Benjamin Becker, 6–4, 1–6(7–2), 6–2.

Doubles

 Miķelis Lībietis /  Dennis Novikov def.  Philip Bester /  Peter Polansky, 7–5, 7–6(7–4).

References

Columbus Challenger 1